The 500 metres speed skating event was part of the speed skating at the 1960 Winter Olympics programme. The competition was held on the Squaw Valley Olympic Skating Rink and for the first time at the Olympics on artificially frozen ice. It was held on Wednesday, February 24, 1960. Forty-six speed skaters from 15 nations competed.

Medalists

Records
These were the standing world and Olympic records (in seconds) prior to the 1960 Winter Olympics.

(*) The record was set in a high altitude venue (more than 1000 metres above sea level) and on naturally frozen ice.

Yevgeny Grishin equalized his own standing world and Olympic record.

Results

Yevgeny Grishin was the first speed skater who was able to defend his 500 metres Olympic title.

References

External links
Official Olympic Report
 

Men's speed skating at the 1960 Winter Olympics